Luciosudis normani, the paperbones, is a species of waryfish found in the ocean depths from .  This species grows to a length of  SL.  This species is the only known member of its genus.

References
 

Notosudidae
Monotypic marine fish genera
Taxa named by Alec Fraser-Brunner